Netherlands competed at the 1906 Intercalated Games in Athens, Greece. Sixteen athletes, all men, competed in eight events in two sports.

Medalists

Fencing

Thirteen fencers competed for the Netherlands, between them winning an individual silver, individual bronze and a team bronze.

Tennis

Three tennis players represented the Netherlands.

References

Nations at the 1906 Intercalated Games
1906
Intercalated Games